Vossa Senhoria, a monthly newspaper first published in 1935 in Brazil, measures 1.4 in. x 1 in. (3.5 cm x 2.5 cm), making it the world's smallest newspaper in terms of size. Each issue has up to 16 pages, and includes photographs, illustrations and advertising space.

The publisher Leônidas Schwindt "saw the small size as a solution for creating a quality low-cost newspaper."

References

1935 establishments in Brazil
Newspapers published in Brazil
Monthly newspapers
Portuguese-language newspapers
Publications established in 1935